Elections to Scottish Borders Council were held on 4 May 2017, the same day as the other Scottish local government elections. The election used the 11 wards created as a result of the Local Governance (Scotland) Act 2004, with each ward electing three or four Councillors using the single transferable vote system, a form of proportional representation, with 34 councillors elected.

Following the 2012 election, the Scottish National Party formed a coalition with the support of the Independents and the Liberal Democrats. The Borders Party also supported this administration. This replaced the previous Conservative-Lib Dem-Independent coalition which existed from 2007-2012.

The council was the first to reveal its administration after the election, with the Conservative group forming a coalition with independents to rule the council. New Tweeddale East councillor Shona Haslam became its leader formally on 18 May. Outgoing independent leader, David Parker, become the council's new convener.

Election results

Ward results

Tweeddale West
2012: 1xLib Dem; 1xCon; 1xSNP
2017: 1xLib Dem; 1xCon; 1xSNP 
2012-2017 Change: No Change

Tweeddale East
2012: 1xSNP; 1xCon; 1xLib Dem
2017: 1xCon; 1xSNP; 1xIndependent 
2012-2017 Change: Independent gain one seat from Lib Dem

Galashiels and District
2012: 2xSNP; 1xBP; 1xIndependent
2017: 1xSNP; 1xCon; 2xIndependent 
2012-2017 Change: Independent and Con gain one seat from SNP and BP

Selkirkshire
2012: 1xCon; 1xLib Dem; 1xIndependent
2017: 1xCon; 1xSNP; 1xIndependent 
2012-2017 Change: SNP gain one seat from Lib Dem

Leaderdale and Melrose
2012: 1xIndependent; 1xBP; 1xSNP
2017: 1xIndependent; 1xCon; 1xSNP 
2012-2017 Change:  Con gain one seat from BP

Mid Berwickshire
2012: 1xSNP; 1xCon; 1xLib Dem
2017: 2xCon; 1xSNP 
2012-2017 Change:  Con gain one seat from Lib Dem

East Berwickshire
2012: 1 x Independent, 1 x Conservative, 1 x SNP
2017: 2 x Conservative, 1 x SNP
2012-2017 Change: 1 x Conservative gain from Independent

Kelso and District
2012: 2 x Conservative, 1 x Liberal Democrat
2017: 2 x Conservative, 1 x Liberal Democrat
2012-2017 Change: No Change

Jedburgh and District
2012: 1 x SNP, 1 x Conservative, 1 x Independent
2017: 2 x Conservative, 1 x SNP
2012-2017 Change: 1 x Conservative from Independent

Hawick and Denholm
2012: 1 x Independent, 1 x Conservative, 1 x SNP
2017: 1 x Independent, 1 x Conservative, 1 x SNP
2012-2017 Change: No Change

Hawick and Hermitage
2012: 1 x Independent, 1 x Liberal Democrat, 1 x Conservative
2017: 2 x Independent, 1 x Conservative
2012-2017 Change: 1 x Independent gain from Liberal Democrats

 = Sitting Councillor from Hawick and Denholm Ward.

Changes since 2017
† On 4 December 2017, Selkirkshire Conservative Cllr Michelle Ballantyne resigned her seat upon her election to the Scottish Parliament. A by-election was held on 22 February 2018 and the seat was won by Independent candidate, Caroline Penman.
†† On 9 March 2020, it was announced that Leaderdale and Melrose SNP Cllr Kevin Drum had died over the weekend. A by-election took place a year later in March 2021 and was won by the Scottish Conservatives.

By-elections since 2017

References

External links
List of candidates Scottish Borders Council

2017
2017 Scottish local elections